Panki is a small town situated in the Palamu district of Jharkhand, India. According to the 2011 census the town has 1,312 households with an aggregate population of 7,743 (4,056 males and 3,687 females). The town is part of the Panki Block, an administrative block of the Palamu district which has 179 registered villages.  The town consists of both Hindu and Muslim communities. Most of them belong to the Other Backward Class.

Languages 
The people from the Panki region speak Hindi, English, Bhojpuri, Urdu, and Magahi and write in Devanagri scripts.

Places of Official Importance

Panki block 

Panki block is one of the administrative blocks of Palamu district, Jharkhand, India. According to the 2011 census the block has 30,725 households with an aggregate population of 1,57,850 (80,749 males and 77,101 females). The block has 179 registered villages.

Education 
 Panki Girls High School
 Rajkiye Buniyadi Ms Panki School
 Shishu Vidya Mandir 
Govt. H/S Panki
 Sarswati Sishu Mandir Panki
 Siksha Niketan
 Upgovernment Primary School Darjahi
 Govt Urdu Ps Panki Bazar
 MK Inter College, Panki, Jharkhand
 Kidz School, Panki
 JKDPS, Panki
 Ankesh Singh (NGO) USKU, PANKI

Economic Interests 
Most of the people from Panki are involved in business and farming, a trend that is gradually changing. Many students from younger generations are choosing full-time jobs instead.

References

External links 
 Panki East Gram Panchayat
 Panki West Gram Panchayat

Cities and towns in Palamu district